Swinelords is the third and final full-length album by Twilightning, released May 7, 2007, on the label Spinefarm Records.

Track listing 
 "Isolation Shell" - 5:15
 "Swinelord" - 4:09
 "Reflection of the Cuckoo" - 4:42
 "Vice Jesus" - 4:17
 "Pimps, Witches, Thieves and Bitches" - 4:12
 "The Gun" - 3:36
 "Not a Word" - 3:54
 "Consume Gap" - 4:09
 "With the Flow" - 5:08
 "Wounded and Withdrawn" - 5:26
 "Maggots (Bonus Track)" - 4:06

Personnel
Tommi Sartanen – Guitars
Ville Wallenius – Guitars
Jussi Kainulainen – Bass guitars
Juha Leskinen – Drums
Heikki Pöyhiä – Vocals

References

2007 albums
Twilightning albums